Hedgehogfjellet is a mountain in Sørkapp Land at Spitsbergen, Svalbard. It has a height of 615 m.a.s.l. The mountain is situated south of Tvillingtoppen, between the sea and the glacier of Hedgehogfonna. 

The lagoon of Davislaguna is located at the foot of  Hedgehogfjellet and Tvillingtoppen.

References

Mountains of Spitsbergen